The Wives of Jamestown is a 1913 American silent film produced by Kalem Company and distributed by General Films Company. It was directed by Sidney Olcott with himself, Gene Gauntier, Helen Lindroth and Jack J. Clark in the leading roles.

Cast
 Gene Gauntier - Lady Geraldine
 Helen Lindroth - Anne McCarthy
 Jack J. Clark - Brian O'Sullivan
 J.P. McGowan - The O'Rourke
 Robert Vignola - Shamus O'Daly

Production notes
 The film was shot in Beaufort, County Kerry, Ireland, and in Norfolk, Va, USA, during the summer of 1912.

References
 Michel Derrien, Aux origines du cinéma irlandais: Sidney Olcott, le premier oeil, TIR 2013.

External links

 The Wives of Jamestown website dedicated to Sidney Olcott

1913 films
Silent American drama films
American silent short films
Films set in Ireland
Films shot in Ireland
Films directed by Sidney Olcott
1913 short films
1913 drama films
American black-and-white films
1910s American films